The Christian Social Party (CSP) is a Christian-democratic political party operating in the German-speaking Community of Belgium. Its president is Luc Frank.

In the 2004 European Parliament election, standing as Christlich-Soziale Partei - Europäische Volkspartei, the party gained the single seat allocated by Belgian law to the German-speaking community. The party has maintained this seat since then. The CSP worked with its Francophone counterpart Humanist Democratic Centre in other elections in the past.

Election results

Parliament of the German-speaking Community

European Parliament

Members 
 Robert J. Houben (1905–1992)

Party logo

References

External links
Official site

Political parties in the German-speaking Community of Belgium
Christian democratic parties in Belgium